Rosslyn Hill Mining Pty Ltd (formerly known as Magellan Metals Pty Ltd) operates Paroo Station Mine (formerly Magellan Mine) at Wiluna in Western Australia.

Rosslyn Hill Mining is wholly owned by and the principal operating asset of Canadian based company LeadFX, with an office in Perth, Western Australia. LeadFX is an international base metals mining, exploration and development company. LeadFX is now private after delisting from the Toronto Stock Exchange.

Paroo Station Mine is an open cut cerussite (lead carbonate) mine and concentrating facility. During operations, lead concentrate was transported by road and rail to the Port of Fremantle in sealed shipping containers, then shipped to overseas markets.

In November 2015 Ivernia Inc and Geo Zone Exploration Limited signed a merger agreement, and on 23 February 2016 rebranded as LeadFX. Rosslyn Hill Mining is a wholly owned subsidiary of LeadFX and continues to operate Paroo Station Mine.

History 
The company was formerly known as Magellan Metals, first registered in 1996. The company has faced challenges with operating and transporting lead to export markets.

Esperance lead issue
Following the reported deaths of native birds at Esperance in Western Australia between December 2006 and March 2007, it was discovered that lead being exported through the town's port had caused or contributed to their deaths.

On 12 March 2007, the board of the Esperance Port Authority put an immediate stop to any further shipments of lead carbonate through the port.

A parliamentary inquiry into the event was instigated and investigated the bird deaths, high blood-lead levels in Esperance residents, and the contamination of the town's water tanks. The inquiry report was published in November 2007. It found that the issues were complex and involved multiple parties, including the Esperance Port Authority and the Department of Environment and Conservation (DEC).

The DEC subsequently instigated legal action against the Esperance Port Authority on various matters relating to polluting the Esperance town site. The Port entered a guilty plea on most charges in October 2009 and was subsequently fined A$525,000 under the WA Environmental Protection Act 1986, the biggest fine ever under the Act.

The government is spending an estimated A$20 million on the cleanup in Esperance. Magellan agreed to make a voluntary contribution of A$9 million to the Western Australian state government towards the cleanup of Esperance and separate A$1 million for community projects in the town.

Sealed shipment process

On 27 July 2012 the Western Australian Minister for Environment approved updated operating conditions to enable Magellan Metals to recommence the export of lead carbonate concentrate via Fremantle Port.

The sealed shipment process used by Magellan Metals is a method of transporting concentrate in sealed, doubled lined bags inside locked steel shipping on rail from the mine site near Wiluna to the Port.
 
As part of the process for approving the updated operating conditions the Minister received advice from the Environmental Protection Authority of Western Australia (EPA) that "the current transport and handling methods are more than sufficient to protect human health and the environment", and that "The transportation of bulk bags in shipping containers is over and above what is required and is best practice".

The sealed shipment process was developed following issues with the bulk loading of lead carbonate concentrate at the Esperance Port in 2006/07, which resulted in fugitive dust emissions, and the Magellan Mine being placed on care and maintenance in 2007.

In August 2009, after extensive community and government consultation, Magellan Metals obtained final approvals to commence bagged and containerised sealed shipments of lead carbonate concentrate through the Port of Fremantle.

In late 2010 Magellan advised the Office of Environmental Protection Authority (OEPA) that airborne lead above baseline levels may have been identified within a small number of sealed containers. The Minister for Environment issued a "stop order" on 31 December 2010.

In early January 2011 the independent laboratory responsible for the testing confirmed that its results were incorrect and that no baseline levels had been exceeded. This position was confirmed by an independent expert commissioned by Magellan Metals and an independent review commissioned by the Western Australian OEPA. Both the government and Magellan Metals confirmed that there was no risk to the community from the transport operations.

In late February 2011 the government lifted the stop order to enable Magellan Metals to commence transporting again. However, after two further interruptions to the transport process involving a train misdirected down a non-approved rail spur and lead in mud on shipping containers in February and March 2011 the company's owner, Ivernia Inc, placed the Magellan Mine operations voluntarily into care and maintenance on 7 April 2011 to conducted and end to end review of operations. Western Australian government agencies conducted their own parallel investigations into the shipment process and issued Interim Conditions.

From April 2011 to July 2012, Magellan Metals undertook a complete review of its operating procedures to ensure the integrity of the sealed shipment process. Western Australian government agencies also investigated and reviewed the events of early 2011 and confirmed that Magellan Metals had not breached its operating conditions and no action would be taken against the company.

New approval
A new ministerial statement, Statement 905 (MS905), was issued by the EPA on 27 July 2012 superseding all previous ministerial statements and focused entirely on the transport route. All conditions related to the transport of lead concentrate in sieve proof bags, sealed in locked shipping containers and the comprehensive compliance program.

New name

On 13 November 2012 Magellen Metals changed its name to Rosslyn Hill Mining Pty Ltd and at the same time Magellan Mine became Paroo Station Mine.

Enirgi Group Corporation takes over business management
On 17 December 2012, Ivernia Inc entered into a management services agreement with Enirgi Metal Group Pty Ltd (EMG), a wholly owned subsidiary of Enirgi Group Corporation. Enirgi Group is owed by the  mining investment firm Sentient Group of Global Funds who has a majority stake in the TSX listed Ivernia Inc. Under the agreement, EMG will take the leading role in managing the restart of operations at the mine, including the design of the organizational structure, as well as responsibility for the day-to-day management of the operation of the mine following restart.

Restart
Roslyn Hill Mining started export of stockpiled lead concentrate in April 2013, and by May 2013 had achieved full mining and processing of lead ore.

Care and maintenance again 
In January 2015 a decision was made to place Paroo Station Mine into full care and maintenance due to depressed global lead prices combined with high treatment charges. The mine ceased operations on 15 February 2015. The last containers of lead concentrate departed the Port of Fremantle on 24 February 2015.

Ivernia Inc to LeadFX

On 23 February 2016, Ivernia Inc announced it had rebranded to LeadFX Inc.

Extension of Fremantle port access 
In November 2016, after an extensive consultation process, Rosslyn Hill Mine received an extension to 2024 for access to the Port of Fremantle to export lead concentrate using the company's best-practice concentrate transportation process. A new ministerial statement, MS1042, was also issued to cover this extension. Ministerial Statement 905 will continue to be in force. For owner LeadFX securing port access is a critical step in the preparations for a potential restart of the Paroo Station Mine in Western Australia.

New technology

LeadFX announced a technology deal with InCoR Technologies (a subsidiary of InCoR Holdings) on 12 May 2017 to conduct a definitive feasibility study (DFS) to design and build a hydrometallurgical facility at Rosslyn Hill Mining's Paroo Station Mine. This deal follows extensive negotiatons with InCoR and The Sentient Group whch began in early 2016. The facility would process lead ore into lead ingots, potentially extending the mine life to 15+ years and completely removing the environmental risks associated with shipping lead concentrate. The DFS on the facility has been commenced by SNC-Lavalin and solely funded by InCoR. InCoR will receive 40% of LeadFX should the study prove to be a success. This ends the consultation process which began in June 2016.

Termination of management agreement 
On 18 August 2017 as a result of the InCoR deal LeadFX announced it was giving 90 days notice of termination of the management services agreement with Enirgi Group Services Australasia Pty Ltd and Enirgi Group Inc (both wholly owned subsidiaries of the Sentient Group of Global Funds, majority shareholder of LeadFX). Under the agreement signed in December 2012, Enirgi managed the day to day affairs of LeadFX and its subsidiary Rosslyn Hill Mining providing necessary employees in accounting, finance, human resources, risk management and other day to day matters. The termination will result in changes to the board including CEO and CFO.

New CEO 
The termination of the management agreement meant the end of Rob Scargill's position  as CEO of LeadFX as he was directly employed by Enirgi Group. On 29 September 2017 Andrew Worland was announced as his replacement. Worland was previously CEO of uranium miner Toro Energy, based in Western Australia.

Going private
On 23 July 2018 LeadFX announced a going private transaction, effectively starting the process to de-list from the Toronto Stock Exchange.
The company formally delisted from the Toronto Stock Exchange on 9 May 2019.

EPA recommends project
On 2 August 2018 the EPA recommended to the WA Environment Minister that the project go ahead due to reduced environmental risk with shipping ingots.
On 25 September 2018, Minister Stephen Dawson signed off on Ministerial Statement 1083, which superseded all previous statements. Statement 1083 retains the MS 905 transport route conditions and also adds the hydrometallurgical plant and 400ha to the development envelope for new 15-year mine life.

Update to definitive feasibility study
On 19 February 2019 LeadFX announced the proposed modifications to the hydro-metallurgical plant can produce 99.99% pure lead metal. The life of the mine, based on proven and probable ore reserves, has been extended to 17 years (from the 15 years announced in the original DFS) as a result of including the ore reserves at the Pizarro deposit, located 10 km to the south of the mine-site, in the life of mine plan.

More funding
17 April 2020 InCoR Holdings announced a further 2million CA to fund LeadFX as part of its drive to develop the 100% owned Rosslyn Hill Mining Pty Ltd Paroo Station Mine. LeadFX is also exploring the used lead acid battery market and is the process of costing up refurbishments to its processing plant.

Wiluna West Iron Ore Project 
On October 22, 2020 GWR Group and their mining contractor Pilbara Resources Group signed an infrastructure agreement with  Rosslyn Hill Mining to utilize the Paroo Station Mine accommodation camp and other infrastructure  to develop the Wiluna West Iron Ore Project located 22 km due south of Paroo Station Mine. This brings much needed income to the cash strapped Rosslyn Hill Mining , in care and maintenance since February 2015.

See also
Environmental issues in Australia

References

External links
 Official website of Magellan Metals
 "WA Government responds to anti-lead protests"
 "Official knew of lead risk breaches"

Mining companies of Australia
Lead mines in Western Australia
Companies based in Perth, Western Australia
Non-renewable resource companies established in 2012
Australian companies established in 2012